Nodojiman The World (のどじまんTHEワールド!), often referred to simply as Nodojiman The World: Song for Japan, Sekai ga Utau Nippon no Meikyoku Senshuken, is a Japanese music television program hosted by duo Masahiro Nakai from Smap and Yukari Nishio and by convention chairman Terry Ito. Debuted on June 25, 2011, it is produced by Nihon TV and airs on Nihon TV twice a year from 19:00 p.m. to 21:54 p.m. (JST).

Overview
The main point of the music show is to give passionate people about Japan from all over the world opportunity to perform the most famous Japanese pop songs on the television stage.

By selective recordings and auditions, only best 12 contestants are always selected and invited to the program.

The singing contest is divided into two parts, in the first part all contestants are introduced in 2 versus teams from different country, the one who get the highest points will pass on the next second part where among of 6 best singers will be decided the final winner.

Voting committee consists of three members who are in Japanese music industry for over two decades such as Tsunku, Tetsuya Komuro or Nanase Aikawa. Based on impression of performance they give together the contestant the highest points. During first year of broadcast winners were only given one prize. However since 2012 after Masahiro has become a regular host of the program, there is given one more special prize named Song in Japan, which makes totally 2 winners.

Its original version NHK Nodo Jiman holds the Guinnes World Record as the longest-running TV music talent show.

Some of the past contestants were successful enough to caught attention to some of Japanese music companies and made their dreams come true by debuting in Japan as a singer such as a Chris Hart, Nicholas Edwards or Diana Garnet.

History
The first episode of Nodojiman was broadcast by TBS television channel on 25 June 2011, hosted by Sachiko Furuichi and Ryou Kawamura.

The second episode was broadcast four months later, on 11 October 2011 and was moved to Nippon TV, hosted by Yukari Nishiro and Masato.

In 2012 Masato was changed and replaced by Masahiro Nakai. Since then this hosting duo with Yukari are both active as of 2018 broadcasts.

In years 2012 and 2013 there were three broadcasts during year, from 2014 it has been officially decided into twice year broadcasts.

Until March 2014 all episodes were recorded inside NTV studio, since October 2014 the shows are recorded in the Maihama Amphitheater.

The broadcast days and times aren't always same, in years 2015-2016 the broadcast aired on Wednesdays and since 2017 until the present the broadcast is scheduled on Saturdays in evening JST. The broadcast schedule last sometimes one or two hours.

Episodes

References

External links
Nippon Television - Nodojiman the World official website 
List of contestants and songs in years 2012-2016 
List of contestants and songs in years 2017-2018 

Japanese music television series
Nippon TV original programming
2011 Japanese television series debuts